The 1995 NCAA Division II men's basketball tournament involved 48 schools playing in a single-elimination tournament to determine the national champion of men's NCAA Division II college basketball as a culmination of the 1994-95 NCAA Division II men's basketball season. It was won by the University of Southern Indiana and UC Riverside's William Wilson was the Most Outstanding Player.

Regional participants

*denotes tie

Regionals

East - Indiana, Pennsylvania 
Location: Memorial Field House Host: Indiana University of Pennsylvania

Third Place - Millersville 89, Gannon 76

South Central - Saint Joseph, Missouri 
Location: MWSC Fieldhouse Host: Missouri Western State University

Third Place - Mississippi College 90, Missouri Western State 77

West - Riverside, California 
Location: UCR Student Recreation Center Host: University of California, Riverside

Third Place - Cal State LA 78, UC Davis 74

North Central - Hays, Kansas 
Location: Gross Memorial Coliseum Host: Fort Hays State University

 Third Place - North Dakota State 84, Regis 72

South Atlantic - Fayetteville, North Carolina 
Location: Felton J. Capel Arena Hosts: Virginia Union University and Fayetteville State University

Third Place - Shaw 96, Johnson C. Smith 90

South - Normal, Alabama 
Location: Elmore Coliseum Host: Alabama A&M University

Third Place - Eckerd 72, Armstrong Atlantic 70

Northeast - Manchester, New Hampshire 
Location: NHC Fieldhouse Host: New Hampshire College

Third Place - St. Anselm 109, St. Rose 92

Great Lakes - Cincinnati, Ohio 
Location: Riverfront Coliseum Host: Northern Kentucky University

Third Place - Quincy (IL) 111, Kentucky Wesleyan 104

*denotes each overtime played

Elite Eight - Louisville, Kentucky
Location:  Commonwealth Convention Center Host: Bellarmine College

*denotes each overtime played

All-tournament team
 Chad Gilbert (Southern Indiana)
 Brian Huebner (Southern Indiana)
 Boo Purdom (UC Riverside)
 Corey Williams (Norfolk State)
 William Wilson (UC Riverside)

See also
1995 NCAA Division I men's basketball tournament
1995 NCAA Division III men's basketball tournament
1995 NAIA Division I men's basketball tournament
1995 NAIA Division II men's basketball tournament
1995 NCAA Division II women's basketball tournament

References
 1995 NCAA Division II men's basketball tournament jonfmorse.com

NCAA Division II men's basketball tournament
Tournament
NCAA Division II basketball tournament
NCAA Division II basketball tournament